Kayleigh Rae (born 11 August 1992), better known as Kay Lee Ray, is a Scottish professional wrestler. She is currently signed to WWE, where she performs on the NXT brand under the ring name Alba Fyre.

Rae began her wrestling career in 2009 and competed on the European independent circuit. She joined Insane Championship Wrestling in 2011, and while there, became a three-time ICW Women's Champion. After competing at the inaugural Mae Young Classic in 2017, Rae signed with WWE in early 2019 and debuted for the NXT UK brand. She moved over to NXT in 2021, and her ring name was changed to Alba Fyre the following year. Rae is a former NXT UK Women's Champion, for which she holds the record for the longest reign at 649 days.

Professional wrestling career

Independent circuit (2009–2019) 
Rae made her professional wrestling debut as Kay Lee Ray at SWA Battlezone on 30 May 2009, losing a Battlezone Rumble to determine the number one contender for the NWA Scottish Heavyweight Championship. On 9 August 2014, Ray defeated Martin Kirby to win the SWE Speed King Championship. On 28 February 2015, she defeated Candice LeRae, Nixon Newell and Saraya Knight to win the SWE Queen of Southside Championship. On 24 October 2015, Ray lost the championship to Newell in a tag team match where Jimmy Havoc, Newell's tag team partner, defended his Speed King Championship against El Ligero, Ray's tag team partner. On 27 December 2015, she was defeated by Ligero in a Loser Leaves Southside match. On 7 August 2016, Ray won the Queen of Southside Championship in a three-way match against Alex Windsor and Jade, a title that she lost two months later to Melina. On 16 June 2017, at WCPW Built to Destroy, Ray won the WCPW Women's Championship from Viper, who replaced Bea Priestley in the match.

Insane Championship Wrestling (2011–present) 
Ray made her Insane Championship Wrestling debut at The Notorious I.C.W. on 6 February 2011, defeating Carmel. At Luke...Who Yer Da? on 4 May 2013, she defeated Viper in a tournament final to win the Fierce Females Championship, her first championship victory. On 27 July 2014 at Shug's Hoose Party, Ray and Stevie Boy unsuccessfully challenged for the vacant ICW Tag Team Championship in a match that was won by BT Gunn and Chris Renfrew. On 29 May 2015, she lost the Fierce Females Championship, now called the Scottish Women's Championship, to Viper in a 20-Woman Rumble, ending Ray's reign at 755 days. On 15 November 2015, Ray faced Nikki Storm and Viper in a three-way match for the inaugural ICW Women's Championship, a match that was won by Viper. On 20 November 2016, Ray won the ICW Women's Championship by defeating Viper and champion Carmel Jacob in a three-way match at Fear & Loathing IX. On 29 July 2017 at Shug's Hoose Party IV, Ray lost the ICW Women's Championship to Kasey Owens in 37 seconds. She won it back at 1 October Fight Club tapings. She lost the title the next month to Owens at Fear & Loathing X on 19 November in a three-way steel cage match also involving Viper. At Fear and Loathing XI on 2 December 2018, Ray won the Women's Championship from Viper in a Queen of Insanity match.

Total Nonstop Action Wrestling (2014–2015) 
Ray appeared for Total Nonstop Action Wrestling (TNA) in 2014 on the second season of TNA British Boot Camp. Her first match on the show was taped on 16 August, where she lost in a four-way match won by Nikki Storm and also involved Kasey Owens and Leah Owens. Her second match was a loss taped on 6 September in an eight-person tag team match alongside Al Snow, Grado, and Mark Andrews against Angelina Love, Dave Mastiff, Rampage Brown, and Noam Dar. On the finale, taped on 7 December, she was revealed to be in the top three competitors, after which she faced Gail Kim in a losing effort. Andrews won the show and the TNA contract. Ray later appeared on two episodes of TNA Xplosion taped in the United Kingdom, with the first being a victory alongside Noam Dar against Gail Kim and Rampage Brown on 29 January 2015, and the other on 31 January in a victory alongside Andrews, Dar, and Crazzy Steve against Brown, Dave Mastiff, Madison Rayne, and Samuel Shaw.

World of Sport (2018–2019) 
At the 5 May 2018 tapings of the newly-revived World of Sport Wrestling, Ray won the vacant WOS Women's Championship in a three-way match against Bea Priestley and Viper. She successfully defended the title on subsequent episodes in a battle royal and a singles match against Viper. On 19 January 2019, on a WOS house show tour, Ray lost her title in a three-way match when she was successfully pinned by Viper.

WWE

WWE debut and Mae Young Classic (2015, 2017) 
Ray made her one-off WWE debut at the 8 October 2015 tapings of NXT, losing to Nia Jax. She would compete in WWE again in 2017 as one of 32 competitors in the inaugural Mae Young Classic, where she lost to Princesa Sugehit in the first round on 13 July. The next night, she competed in a six-woman tag team match as part of the WWE Mae Young Classic – Road To The Finals event, where she teamed up with Jazzy Gabert and Tessa Blanchard to defeat Marti Belle, Santana Garrett, and Sarah Logan.

NXT UK (2019–2021) 
At NXT UK TakeOver: Blackpool on 12 January 2019, Ray and Jazzy Gabert appeared at ringside. It was later confirmed that the two had signed with WWE, marking Ray's first contract with WWE. On 13 March, Ray made her NXT UK in-ring debut as a villainness, defeating Candy Floss. On the June 19 episode of NXT UK, Ray won a battle royal to earn an opportunity to face NXT UK Women's Champion Toni Storm at a time of her choosing. On 17 July episode of NXT UK, Ray said she will face Storm at NXT UK TakeOver: Cardiff. At TakeOver: Cardiff, Ray defeated Storm to win the NXT UK Women's Championship, becoming the first British-born wrestler to hold the title.

On 13 November episode of NXT, Ray interfered during a "WarGames Advantage" ladder match between Shayna Baszler's team member Io Shirai and Rhea Ripley's team member Mia Yim, helping Shirai win the match and revealing herself as the fourth member of Baszler's team in the first ever Women's WarGames Match. Ripley's team would go on and defeat Baszler's team at NXT TakeOver: WarGames. On the 8 January 2020 episode of NXT, Ray returned and teamed with Bianca Belair and Io Shirai in a six-woman tag team match against Storm, Ripley and Candice LeRae in a losing effort.

On the 12 December episode of NXT UK, it was announced that Ray would defend the NXT UK Women's Championship against Storm and Piper Niven in a triple threat match at NXT UK TakeOver: Blackpool II. Ray would go on to retain her title against Storm and Niven at TakeOver: Blackpool II. On the 27 February episode of NXT UK, Ray retained her title against Storm in a stipulation that if Storm loses, she could no longer challenge Ray as long as she is champion. After the match, Ray started a feud with Niven after Niven watched Ray brutally attack Storm during the "I Quit" match. On the 2 April episode of NXT UK, Ray and Jinny successfully defeated Niven and Dani Luna.

On the 24 September episode of NXT UK, Ray retained her title against Niven. On the 5 November episode of NXT UK, Ray and Niven's feud continued after Ray insulted Niven, so Niven came out and attacked Ray in the ring and backstage. On the 19 November episode of NXT UK, Ray was again successful in defending her title against Niven in a Falls Count Anywhere Match, when Jinny interfered as a result of Niven disrespecting her two weeks prior. In the following weeks, Ray retained her title in a championship match against Jinny on the 21 January 2021 episode and Meiko Satomura on the 4 March episode of NXT UK. On the 10 June episode of NXT UK, Ray lost the title to Satomura, ending her record-setting reign at 649 days.

NXT (2021–present) 
At NXT TakeOver 36 on 22 August, Ray made her debut appearance for NXT at the conclusion of the NXT Women's Championship match between Raquel González and Dakota Kai. On the 23 November episode of NXT, Ray distracted Mandy Rose during her match against Cora Jade, causing Rose to lose the match. Later that night, she joined Io Shirai's team at NXT WarGames. At WarGames on 5 December, her team was victorious; during the match, she teased turning on her team when she approached an injured Jade with a kendo stick, only to turn and attack Kai instead. Ray would unsuccessfully challenge Mandy Rose for the NXT Women's Championship on the 8 February 2022 episode of NXT due to interference from Toxic Attraction (Gigi Dolin and Jacy Jayne). Shortly after, her and Io Shirai would team up in the 2022 Women's Dusty Rhodes Tag Team Classic where they defeated Amari Miller and Lash Legend in the first round, Kacy Catanzaro and Kayden Carter in the semifinals and Dakota Kai and Wendy Choo in the finals. This would lead to a fatal four-way match at NXT Stand & Deliver on 2 April where she failed to win the NXT Women's Championship. On the 26 April episode of NXT, Ray's ring name was changed to Alba Fyre.

On the 10 May episode of NXT, Fyre defeated Amari Miller in her first match since her name change. After defeating Tatum Paxley on the 7 June episode of NXT, Fyre was attacked by Lash Legend, starting a feud between the two. Fyre would defeat Legend on the 21 June episode of NXT by disqualification (after Legend used Fyre's own bat) and on the 2 August episode. At Halloween Havoc on 22 October, Fyre unsuccessfully challenged Mandy Rose for the NXT Women's Championship. On the 15 November episode of NXT, Fyre lost her championship rematch against Rose in a Last Woman Standing match when a returning Isla Dawn interfered. This led to a match between Fyre and Dawn at NXT Deadline on 10 December where Dawn was victorious. Fyre defeated Dawn in an Extreme Resolution match on the 3 January 2023 episode of NXT and failed to win the NXT Women's Tag Team Championship three weeks later. Fyre turned heel again and joined forces with Dawn on 31 January episode of NXT.

Personal life 
In July 2021, Rae married her boyfriend of over thirteen years, fellow professional wrestler Stephen Kerr, better known by his ring name Stevie Boy Xavier.

Championships and accomplishments 

 What Culture Pro Wrestling/Defiant Wrestling
 What Culture Pro Wrestling/Defiant Women's Championship (1 time)
 Insane Championship Wrestling
 Fierce Females/Scottish Women's Championship (1 time)
 ICW Women's Championship (3 times)
 Queen of Insanity (2019)
 Pro-Wrestling: EVE
 Pro-Wrestling: EVE Championship (1 time)
 Pro Wrestling Illustrated
 Ranked No. 18 of the top 100 female wrestlers in the PWI Women's 100 in 2020
 Ranked No. 17 of the top 150 female wrestlers in the PWI Women's 150 in 2021
 Shimmer Women Athletes
 ChickFight Tournament (2015)
 Southside Wrestling Entertainment
 Queen of Southside Championship (3 times)
 SWE Speed King Championship (1 time)
 World of Sport Wrestling
 WOS Women's Championship (1 time)
 WWE
 NXT UK Women's Championship (1 time)
 Women's Dusty Rhodes Tag Team Classic (2022) – with Io Shirai

Notes

References

External links 

 
 
 
 

1992 births
21st-century professional wrestlers
Living people
Sportspeople from Paisley, Renfrewshire
Scottish female professional wrestlers
NXT UK Women's Champions
Scottish expatriate sportspeople in the United States